Sabbath School, Saturday pre-service lessons for a congregation of seventh-day Christian denominations
 Sunday school, Christian religious school sessions for children held on Sundays, and known by some denominations as Sabbath School.
 Hebrew school, Jewish religious school sessions for children, sometimes held on the Sabbath and then known as Sabbath School.